The Polk County Democrat is a newspaper published in Bartow, Florida, Polk County, Florida. It is a semi-weekly paper which began publication in 1931 and is the only newspaper published within Bartow. The paper endorsed the U.S. Senate campaign of Katherine Harris, a graduate of Bartow High School. The Democrat was run by members of the Frisbie family for many years. It is owned by Sun Coast Media Group. Louise Kelley Frisbie was a columnist at the paper.

References

Bartow, Florida
Publications established in 1931
1931 establishments in Florida
Newspapers published in Florida